The 2016 European Throwing Cup was held on 12 and 13 March at the Gloria Arad Stadium in Arad, Romania. It was the sixteenth edition of the athletics competition for throwing events and was jointly organised by the European Athletic Association. The competition featured men's and women's contests in shot put, discus throw, javelin throw and hammer throw. In addition to the senior competitions, there were under-23 events for younger athletes.

Medal summary

Senior

Under-23

References

External links
Official website

European Throwing Cup
European Cup Winter Throwing
Winter Throwing
International sports competitions hosted by Romania
Arad, Romania
March 2016 sports events in Romania